Jordan River Off-Highway Vehicle State Recreation Area is a Utah State Park located in Salt Lake City, Utah, USA.  The park is dedicated to recreation with off highway vehicles. It consists of four separate tracks, with tabletops and banked turns, and is open from approximately early April to approximately mid-October. Off-highway motorcycle (OHM) riders have access to two motocross tracks. The novice and grand-prix tracks are open to both OHMs and all-terrain vehicles.

All riders must wear a helmet and all machines must be currently registered. Before riding here, or on any public land, youth from 8–16 years old (and until they get a driver license) must take and pass the state-required youth off-highway vehicle (OHV) education program; children under the age of eight may not operate an OHV on public land in Utah. Youth must carry their safety certificate while riding.

References

External links
 Jordan River Off-Highway Vehicle State Recreation Area

Off-roading
Parks in Salt Lake City
Protected areas established in 2002
State parks of Utah
2002 establishments in Utah